Yannick Nzie (born 16 November 1991 in Cameroon) is an American-Cameroonian footballer who plays for Defensor La Bocana of the Peruvian Segunda División as of 2017. He mostly operates as an offensive midfielder.

Career

One of four foreigners flown in to play for Defensor La Bocana in 2016, Nzie only featured once that year, in  a 2–0 loss to Alianza Universidad and was given the nickname 'Pepito'. The Cameroonian-born American found it difficult to adapt as he rarely made the roster.

Having a trial with Estonian outfit Lokomotiv Johvi in summer 2014, the club decided not to buy him and the move never transpired.

References

External links
 at Soccerway

Living people
1991 births
Cameroonian footballers
American people of Cameroonian descent
American soccer players
American expatriate soccer players
Association football midfielders
Cameroonian expatriate footballers
Expatriate footballers in Peru